Alexander Leonel Corro (born 27 January 1988) is an Argentine professional footballer who plays as a defensive midfielder.

Honours
Cobreloa
 Primera División de Chile: runner-up 2011 Clausura

References
 
 

1988 births
Living people
Argentine footballers
Association football midfielders
Club Atlético Atlanta footballers
Arsenal de Sarandí footballers
Cobreloa footballers
Cobresal footballers
Unión Magdalena footballers
Deportes Quindío footballers
El Tanque Sisley players
Ñublense footballers
Chilean Primera División players
Primera B de Chile players
Argentine expatriate footballers
Argentine expatriate sportspeople in Chile
Expatriate footballers in Chile
Argentine expatriate sportspeople in Colombia
Expatriate footballers in Colombia
Argentine expatriate sportspeople in Uruguay
Expatriate footballers in Uruguay
Footballers from Buenos Aires